Levani Kavjaradze (born 21 July 1996) is a Georgian Greco-Roman wrestler. In 2019, he won one of the bronze medals in the 63 kg event at the 2019 European Wrestling Championships held in Bucharest, Romania.

Major results

References

External links 
 

Living people
1996 births
Place of birth missing (living people)
Male sport wrestlers from Georgia (country)
European Wrestling Championships medalists
21st-century people from Georgia (country)